Lieutenant-General Geoffrey Walsh, CBE, DSO, CD (19 August 1909 – 3 April 1999) was a Canadian soldier and Chief of the General Staff, the head of the Canadian Army from 1961 – 1964; Walsh was the last officer to hold this appointment as it was eliminated in 1964 as part of the reorganization of Canada's military in the lead-up to the 1968 unification of the Canadian Forces. The most senior army appointment after unification, the Commander of Mobile Command, had a much-reduced scope of authority.

Military career
Educated at St Catherine's Collegiate School, Walsh was commissioned into the Royal Canadian Engineers in 1930.

He served in World War II with the Canadian Army Service Force and took part in the Spitsbergen Raid in 1941. In 1942 he transferred to the 1st Canadian Division and fought in Sicily and Italy. In 1944 he was made Commander Royal Engineers for 4th Canadian (Armoured) Division. and he later became CRE with II Canadian Corps, commanded by Guy Simonds, which took part in Operation Overlord.

After the war he was appointed Commander, Eastern Ontario Area, followed by Commander, 27th Brigade before his appointment as Director-General of Military Training. In 1955 he was appointed Quartermaster-General of the Canadian Army and in 1959 he became General Officer Commanding, Western Command. In 1961 he was made Chief of the General Staff and in 1964, became Vice Chief of the Defence Staff.

Family
In 1935, he married Gwynn Abigail Currie with whom he had one son.

References

External links
Generals of World War II

1909 births
1999 deaths
Canadian generals
Canadian Commanders of the Order of the British Empire
Canadian Companions of the Distinguished Service Order
Vice Chiefs of the Defence Staff (Canada)
Canadian Army personnel of World War II
Royal Canadian Engineers officers
Commanders of the Canadian Army
Canadian military personnel from Ontario
Canadian Militia officers